Heliobolus nitidus, also known as the glittering sand lizard, is a species of lizard. It is found in Nigeria, Togo, Benin, Democratic Republic of the Congo, Central African Republic, Chad, Ivory Coast, Guinea, Cameroon, Burkina Faso, Niger, and Uganda. It is widespread but uncommon in the Sudanese–Guinean savanna belt.

References

Heliobolus
Lacertid lizards of Africa
Reptiles of West Africa
Reptiles of Cameroon
Reptiles of the Central African Republic
Reptiles of the Democratic Republic of the Congo
Reptiles of Nigeria
Reptiles described in 1872
Taxa named by Albert Günther